Jolly Boy is an Indian Kannada-language romantic drama film written and directed by Sabapathy Dekshinamurthy, which stars Diganth and Rekha Vedavyas in the lead roles, along with Devaraj, Tara and Sudha Rani. A remake of the director's 2011 Tamil film Pathinaaru, it is produced by K. Manju and features the music  by Yuvan Shankar Raja.

Plot 
Shiva (Shiva) and Indhu (Madhu Shalini) are college students who both fall in love with each other. However, Indhu's father Gopalakrishnan (Abhishek) and mother (Amritha) oppose their love as they do not trust love and try to convince Indhu for which she does not agree. One day, Indhu's mother gives a book titled "Pathinaru" and asks Shiva and Indhu to read so that they might change their opinions about love.

Now the story moves back to a village in 1980s which describes a teenage love between Gopi (Kishore Kumar) and Ilavarasi (Vinitha). Gopi is from a poor family, while Ilavarasi is from an affluent family in the same village. When her parents find out about their love, they try all means to separate them. Finally, Gopi and Ilavarasi decide to run away from the village, but they are caught by their parents.

Ilavarasi goes to the extent of abandoning her family and wealth for the sake of Gopi. She asks Gopi in front of villagers to buy her a saree with his income, so that she can wear that and leave the village as she does not want any of her ancestral wealth and she waits for Gopi's arrival. Gopi goes to a nearby town to earn some money so that he can buy her a saree, but he meets with an accident and goes unconscious. Gopi is saved by a lorry driver and is admitted in a hospital. He recovers after a few months and returns to the village to meet Ilavarasi, but is shocked to know that her wedding is on the same day with someone. Gopi is shocked and leaves the village with sorrows.

The book ends there, and Indhu's mother reveals that Gopi is none other than Indhu's father Gopalakrishnan. She also convinces Indhu that Gopi transformed into Gopalakrishnan, which made him successful in life rather than keep worrying about his failed love. Now, Indhu doubts the credibility of love and decides to accept her parents' words.

But Shiva tries to find the whereabouts of Ilavarasi and leaves to the village. After meeting many people, Shiva finds the place where Ilavarasi is currently and goes to meet her. He also takes Gopalakrishnan with him. Gopalakrishnan is shocked to see Ilavarasi (Kasthuri), who now runs an orphanage in the memory of Gopi. Gopalakrishnan gets to know that Ilavarasi did not agree for the wedding and came away from her family and till the time she lives with memory of Gopi. Gopalakrishnan feels guilty but understands the power of true love and decides to get Shiva and Indhu married.

Cast 
 Diganth as Ganesh 
 Rekha Vedavyas as Indusri 
 Devaraj as Gopalaswamy 
 Tara
 Sudha Rani
 Avinash
 Faisal Mohammed as Gopi 
 Archana as Indu 
 Sasikala
 Jayakrishna
 Bank Janardhan
 Bhagya
 Amogh Hande
 Baby Bhavana

Soundtrack 

The soundtrack to Jolly Boy features 5 tracks, composed by Yuvan Shankar Raja for the original Tamil version. The album was released in April 2011 by director Indrajit Lankesh at the Abhimani Convention Center, Bangalore.

Reception

References

External links 

Kannada remakes of Tamil films
2010s Kannada-language films
Indian romantic drama films
2011 romantic drama films
2011 films
Films directed by Sabapathy Dekshinamurthy